Coccorella atrata is a species of sabertooth fish. It is a deepwater species found at depths of 300–2,626 m in the Indian and  Pacific oceans.

References

Evermannellidae
Fish described in 1894